Leetown is an unincorporated community in Hancock County, Mississippi, United States.

Notes

Unincorporated communities in Hancock County, Mississippi
Unincorporated communities in Mississippi